Members of the New South Wales Legislative Assembly who served in the 40th  parliament held their seats from 1962 to 1965. They were elected at the 1962 state election, and at by-elections. The Speaker was Ray Maher.

See also
Second Heffron ministry
Renshaw ministry
Results of the 1962 New South Wales state election
Candidates of the 1962 New South Wales state election

References

Members of New South Wales parliaments by term
20th-century Australian politicians